Yao Beina (September 26, 1981 – January 16, 2015), also known as Bella Yao, was a Chinese singer and songwriter. She debuted as the diva of the musical theater Jin Sha (金沙) in 2005. After her graduation from China Conservatory of Music in the same year, she joined the Chinese Song and Dance Ensemble in the Political Department of the People's Liberation Army Navy as a professional singer. She performed as one of the singing assistants at Song Zuying's solo concert at the Kennedy Center, Washington D.C. in 2006. 

Yao won the CCTV National Young Singer Contest (the group of popular singing) in 2008 with the first and the only 100 points throughout the history of the contest. She was one of the musical acts at the Beijing 2008 Summer Olympics closing ceremony. Her debut extended play, Too Late (来不及), was released in 2009 after her military discharge. 

Yao was best known by recording soundtracks and theme songs for movies and TV shows, such as Empresses in the Palace, Painted Skin: The Resurrection, and Back to 1942. She also recorded the Mandarin version of Let It Go, the pop-version song from Disney's Frozen. In 2013, she was invited to be a contestant of The Voice of China and gained great popularity through it.

Early life 
Yao was born to a family of musicians on September 26, 1981, in Wuhan, China. Her father, Yao Feng (姚峰; Yáo Fēng), is a visiting professor at Wuhan Conservatory of Music and the chairman of the Shenzhen Association of Musicians; her mother, Li Xinmin (李信敏; Lǐ Xìnmǐn), is a former singer of the Hubei Song and Dance Ensemble.

At the age of four, Yao started to learn piano with her parents' guidance. According to her father, she could correctly hear and tell the notes of piano keys when she was six. She first performed a song on a local TV channel when she was nine and occasionally showed up on galas and singing contests as a child star since then throughout her childhood and adolescence.

Yao attended Wuhan No. 45 Middle School as a junior high student from 1993 to 1997, during which she was determined to be a singer in her future. She was admitted to the Affiliated High School of Wuhan Conservatory of Music as the top scorer of the major of Popular Music in 1997, and her father, Yao Feng, who at that time was the associate dean of the Department of Vocal Music at Wuhan Conservatory of Music and also the founder of that major, became her advisor. Yao started to learn music systematically from then on. Due to the fact that her father's job was then transferred to Shenzhen in 1998 and that the major of Popular Music was suspended therewith, she was transferred to the major of Folk Music under Professor Feng Jiahui (冯家慧).

In 2000, Yao graduated from high school and was admitted to the Department of Vocal and Opera at China Conservatory of Music with the highest score among her class. She continued the major of Folk Music under Professor Dong Hua (董华) and Professor Ma Qiuhua (马秋华).

Career 
Yao worked for four years in the Naval Political Department of the Song and Dance Troupe of the People's Liberation Army, after graduating from the acclaimed China Conservatory of Music in 2005. During her servicing in the Troupe, she won the champion in Chinese Young Singer Championship.

She rose to prominence after winning the Chinese Young Singer TV competition Championship in 2008 with the first full mark in history. She performed on the stage of Beijing Olympic Games Closing Ceremony.

In 2009, she left the Troupe and signed with a label called "乐巢音尚" (Yuècháo Yīnshàng). After giving her first concert in Shenzhen in 2010, she released her first album named after herself, Yao Beina. The songs, mainly composed by herself, received widespread praise. She impressed Liu Huan and got the opportunity to sing the theme song of the TV series Empresses in the Palace. Yao became well known to the public after she made a series of songs for the hit drama Empresses in the Palace, in 2012. In the same year, Yao was invited by the director Feng Xiaogang to sing the theme song "The River of The Life" of the film Back to 1942. She sang "Love in the Painting" for Painted Skin: The Resurrection, the highest grossing domestic film in China. As of 2012, she has made songs for 60 TV dramas and films, and performed twice in CCTV New Year's Galas in 2007 and 2010.

Yao returned to CCTV Young Singer TV Competition as the youngest judge of this music show in 2013. In the same year, she released her new album Half of Me. All of songs in this album topped Baidu Music Chart, making her the No.1 Mandopop Female Singer on Baidu Music. According to the sales and reputation of the album, Yao attained the title "the best female vocalist" on MusicRadio China TOP Charts Awards. She was the first pop solo vocalist performing the finale of CCTV New Year's Gala.

Yao gradually accumulated her fame for singing theme songs of Empresses in the Palace, Painted Skin: The Resurrection and Back to 1942. She was the designated singer of the Mandarin version of Let It Go (at the end of the movie) for the Disney film Frozen. She competed in The Voice of China television reality show. Yao's performance caused an Internet sensation that led to her almost-overnight popularity with the No.1 Internet Searched pop star in the Baidu and Sina Weibo.

Performances in The Voice:

Illness and death 
Yao was diagnosed with breast cancer in May 2011.

In September 2013, Yao was invited to become the image ambassador for China Pink Ribbon Campaign, which aims to raise awareness of breast cancer. As a breast cancer survivor, she was considered the most suitable candidate for the post.

In December of that year, Yao released the song "Fire of the Heart", which describes her struggle and pain when she was diagnosed with breast cancer in 2011 at the age of 30. "If you never cry in the middle of the night, you will never be qualified to talk about fate… don't ask me why, because I have fought the devil several times," she wrote in the lyrics.

Fortunately, Yao survived, but the cost was high. She underwent a mastectomy and had her left breast removed. "It is a wise choice if you face reality and bravely fight and defeat cancer," Yao said. After the surgery, Yao went through eight sessions of chemotherapy, during which she recorded the songs for Empresses in the Palace television series.

Yao hoped her story and her songs could bring hope to those suffering from breast cancer. "I hope I can bring strength to people and boost their confidence with my songs," she said. Because of her personal experience, Yao had a solid understanding of the fear and pain that breast cancer patients suffer from, both physically and psychologically. After recovering, Yao joined Pink Ribbon campaign to raise awareness of preventing and treating breast cancer.

As is traditional with this campaign, Yao needed to make a topless poster to remind women to take care of their body and raise the public's awareness of women's breast health. The visceral impact of seeing a woman with an amputated breast, especially in an age saturated in images of commodified female flesh, has proven to be a successful, yet shocking method of raising awareness, among both men and women. Growing up in a relatively conservative society, Yao initially felt nervous, but later relaxed after thinking about "bringing victims courage by doing so." In the autumn of 2013, Yao's posters were posted across the country. Through these posters, Yao wanted to send the message "You can win in the battle against breast cancer."

In September of that year, she visited patients at Beijing Cancer Hospital. Yao also talked with members of the Beijing Cancer Rehabilitation Association. Through these efforts, Yao wanted everyone to know that, "When facing cancer, you have no other choice than to defeat it." On the other hand, Yao understood that many breast cancer sufferers fear that they may lose their breasts. With her personal experiences, Yao sought to show them that breast cancer surgery would not cause more damage than the cancer itself and to help to persuade them to choose proper treatment therapies according to doctor's advice.

In December 2014, Yao had a recurrence of the cancer and her situation was reported to have worsened on 15 January 2015. She died a day later in Shenzhen, Guangdong, aged 33. According to her wishes, her corneas were donated to two recipients in Shenzhen and Chengdu.

Memorial services were held on 20 January. Her first posthumous album, "Eternal", was produced by Liu Chia-chang.

Her ashes were interred on 4 September in the Shimenfeng Memorial Park on Wuhan, prior to the release of her second posthumous album "Born Proud", which was still under production at the time of her death. It was released on what would have been her 34th birthday (26 September 2015) and was supposed to be the celebration of her homecoming. The album was listed as one of the best selling albums in the year list of Jingdong Mall.

Her posthumous single, "Glory", was released on 16 January 2016 (one-year anniversary of her death), peaking at No.2 on the QQ Music New Single Chart.

On April 12, 2019, coach Liu Huan sung a medley of three songs dedicated to Yao, on the finals of the seventh season of I'm a Singer; his performance was received praise from the panel of audience, and eventually won the competition with over 60% of the votes cast.

Charities and social contributions 

As an enlisted member of the Naval Political Department of the Song and Dance Troupe of the People's Liberation Army in 2008, Yao was ordered to help relieve the earthquake zones in Sichuan province, where more than 80,000 people lost their lives. She and her colleagues traveled to the disaster zones and performed for the survivors as well as the PLA soldiers working in the area. She personally donated 30,000 RMB (US$5,000) while her annual salary as an enlisted member was estimated to be less than 15,000 RMB (US$2,500).

According to later documented interviews with her, she was coping with a long term depression at the moment of the earthquake and she had constant thoughts of death. Due to the depression, she finally left the Troupe after requesting resignation for the third time in 2009.

In addition to cancer awareness activities, Yao also attended an awareness-raising event for the care of children as the "Ambassador of Love" in 2014. Regretting not having any child of her own, possibly because of the cancer, she once commented during an interview: "When you saw all of your friends have children who are old enough to run errands, and post their pictures on the Internet, this was the only time you would feel just a little stimulated."

Her decision came at the end of 2014 to donate her organs in case of death.This turned public at 2015,but the metastasis left only her corneas intact and suitable for donation. So far her corneas have helped four patients to recover their visions. Shortly after her death, the number of Chinese people who voluntarily signed organ donation agreement had doubled within a month. This coincides with the government announcement that from the first day of 2015, organ harvesting from executed prisoners was banned in China. The unexpected coincidence was mentioned by the Minister of Health, Huang Jiefu, during a TV interview and he said: "Maybe we can still hear her singing in Heaven..."

Her parents auctioned her personal belongings on the Internet after her death. The auction raised 2,510,000 RMB (~US$400,000) and they were donated to a high school in the Xinjiang province, where Yao Beina and her father had an inspiration for writing a song that incorporated the unique local ethnic music style. The donation was to be dedicated to renovating the school and a scholarship for achievements in music. According to her father, helping the local children was a wish that she had long shared with him.

Legacy 
On April 9, 2015, according to the news released by National Aeronautics and Space Administration (NASA), the asteroid "41981" was named after Yao Beina. The asteroid was discovered by William Kwong Yu Yeung in 2000, an amateur astronomer from Hong Kong. The International Astronomical Union (IAU) named the asteroid "Yaobeina", which was suggested by Yeung in memory of the singer. NASA describes Yao Beina in its website as "Yaobeina (1981–2015) was a talented and courageous Chinese singer who won numerous awards for the best Chinese pop song performance. One of Yao's songs, "Fire of the Heart", was about the reflections on her battle with breast cancer.

Awards

References

External links 
  Yao Beina Memorial website

1981 births
2015 deaths
Chinese women singer-songwriters
Musicians from Wuhan
China Conservatory of Music alumni
Deaths from cancer in the People's Republic of China
Chinese Mandopop singers
Deaths from breast cancer
The Voice of China contestants
21st-century Chinese women singers